Virginio Brivio (born 19 August 1961) is an Italian politician.

He is a member of the Democratic Party.

He served as President of the Province of Lecco from 2004 to 2009 and was elected Mayor of Lecco at the 2010 Italian local elections. He took office on 30 March 2010. Brivio was re-elected for a second term on 16 June 2015.

See also
2010 Italian local elections
2015 Italian local elections
List of mayors of Lecco

References

External links
 

1961 births
Living people
Mayors of Lecco
People from Lecco
Democratic Party (Italy) politicians
Presidents of the Province of Lecco